Aakasha Kottayile Sultan is a 1991 Indian Malayalam-language film, directed by Jayaraj and starring Sreenivasan and Saranya Ponvannan in lead roles.

Cast

 Sreenivasan as Kesavan Kutty
 Saranya Ponvannan as Mallika
 Innocent as 	Dr. Chenthrappinni 
 Mamukkoya as Cleitus
 K. P. A. C. Lalitha as Meenakshi
 Maniyanpilla Raju as 	Murali
 Zainuddin as Chenthrappinni's Assistant	
 Sankaradi as Pillaichan
 Oduvil Unnikrishnan as Ramakrishna Iyer
 Baiju Santhosh as Vishwambharan
 Murali as Georgekutty
 Prathapachandran 	
 Krishnan Kutty Nair
 Paravoor Bharathan as Raghavan Nair
 Alummoodan as  Pappy
 Adoor Bhavani as Pappy's Sister
 Manorama as Kumudam
 Mavelikkara Ponnamma as  Mariyamma
 Meena as Pappy's Sister
 Unnimary as Pappy's Sister
 Santha Devi as Kesavan Kutty's Mother
 Kalabhavan Rahman as Chenthrappinni's Asst
 Philomina as Pappy's Sister
 Praseetha Menon as Kasthuri	
 Mohanlal (cameo)
 Alleppey Ashraf Doctor

Soundtrack 
The film's soundtrack contains 4 songs, all composed by Raveendran and Lyrics by O. N. V. Kurup.

References

External links
 

1991 films
1990s Malayalam-language films
Films directed by Jayaraj